Hammer of the North is the fifth full-length album by Swedish heavy metal band Grand Magus. The CD was recorded at 301 studios outside of Stockholm, Sweden, and features artwork by Necrolord. The album was released on 23 June 2010 on the record label Roadrunner Records.

Track listing 
 "I, the Jury" – 4:15
 "Hammer of the North" – 5:13
 "Black Sails" – 5:08
 "Mountains Be My Throne" – 3:46
 "Northern Star" – 4:19
 "The Lord of Lies" – 6:14
 "At Midnight They'll Get Wise" – 3:45
 "Bond of Blood" – 4:44
 "Savage Tales" – 4:42
 "Ravens Guide Our Way" – 5:52

Japanese bonus track
"Crown of Iron"

Limited edition bonus DVD
 "Hammer of the North" video
 "At Midnight They'll Get Wise" video
 Behind the Scenes
 Track by Track
 Private Talk

Reception 
Germany's Metal Hammer named Hammer of the North the Album of the Month July.

Personnel 
Janne "JB" Christoffersson – vocals, guitars
Mats "Fox" Skinner – bass
Sebastian Sippola – drums

References 

2010 albums
Grand Magus albums
Roadrunner Records albums